Uppoor  is a village in the southern state of Karnataka, India. It is located in the Udupi taluk of Udupi district in Karnataka.

Demographics
As of 2001 India census, Uppoor had a population of 7170 with 3481 males and 3689 females.

See also
 Udupi
 Districts of Karnataka

References

External links
 http://Udupi.nic.in/

Villages in Udupi district